Low-energy buildings, which include zero-energy buildings, passive houses and green buildings, may use any of a large number of techniques to lower energy use.

The following are some of the techniques used to achieve low-energy buildings, which excludes energy generation (microgeneration).

Improvements to building envelope
 Active daylighting
 Barra system
 Brise soleil
 Cool roof and green roof
 Daylighting
 Double envelope house
 Earth sheltering
 Energy plus house
 Fluorescent lighting, compact fluorescent lamp, and LED lighting
 History of passive solar building design
 Low-energy house
 Passive daylighting
 Passive house
 Passive solar 
 Passive solar building design
 Quadruple glazing
 Solar energy
 Superinsulation
 Sustainable architecture
 Sustainability
 Trombe wall
 Windcatcher
 Zero energy building
 Zero heating building

Improvements to heating, cooling, ventilation and water heating
 Absorption refrigerator
 Annualized geothermal solar
 Earth cooling tubes
 Geothermal heat pump
 Heat recovery ventilation
 Hot water heat recycling
 Passive cooling
 Renewable heat
 Seasonal thermal energy storage (STES)
 Solar air conditioning
 Solar hot water

Energy rating systems

EnerGuide (Canada)
Home energy rating (US)
House Energy Rating (Australia)
LEED - Leadership in Energy and Environmental Design
National Home Energy Rating (UK)

Techniques
Sustainable building
Architecture lists
Energy-related lists
Lists related to renewable energy